Kentucky Route 331 (KY 331) is a  state highway in the U.S. state of Kentucky. The highway travels through northwestern parts of Owensboro, within Daviess County.

Route description
KY 331 begins at an intersection with U.S. Route 60 (US 60) in the northwestern part of Owensboro, within Daviess County. It travels to the east-southeast, along the northern edge of Joe Ford Nature Park, and turns to the north-northwest. At this point, it temporarily leaves the city limits of Owensboro. When it re-enters the city, it is just west of the Thompson–Berry Park. The highway again leaves the city and curves to the north-northeast. When it re-enters the city, it curves to the east-southeast and begins to curve back to the north-northwest. It leaves the city one final time for a very brief distance. After the highway re-enters the city, it curves to the northwest and begins to parallel some railroad tracks of CSX. Just after the highway curves back to the north-northwest, it intersects the eastern terminus of both Griffith Station Road and Lower River Road and meets its northern terminus.

Major intersections

See also

References

0331
Transportation in Daviess County, Kentucky
Owensboro, Kentucky
U.S. Route 60